Dean Clarke may refer to:

 Dean Clarke (footballer, born 1977), English footballer
 Dean Clarke (Irish footballer) (born 1993), Irish footballer

See also
 Dean Clark (disambiguation)